Molla Mahmud (also Romanized as Mollā Maḩmūd) is a village in Abbas-e Sharqi Rural District, Tekmeh Dash District, Bostanabad County, East Azerbaijan Province, Iran. At the 2006 census, its population was 43, in 8 families.

References 

Populated places in Bostanabad County